The first USS Quinnebaug was a screw sloop-of-war in the United States Navy.

Construction and commissioning
Quinnebaug was built by the New York Navy Yard in Brooklyn, New York. She was launched on 31 March 1866, sponsored by Lieutenant Commander David B. Harmony, and commissioned on 19 July 1867, Commander Edward Barrett in command.

Service history
Quinnebaug departed New York City on 31 August 1867 and cruised along the Atlantic coast of South America for almost three years before arriving at Norfolk, Virginia, on 18 July 1870. She was decommissioned there on 29 July 1970 and was laid up until broken up in 1871.

References

Sloops of the United States Navy
1866 ships